I Gave You by Bonny / Sweeney is a CD EP released, July 26, 2005 on Drag City in the US, and Domino in Europe. The title track is taken from the album Superwolf (2005), a collaboration between Will Oldham and Matt Sweeney. The disc is an Enhanced CD, and contains the music video of "I Gave You" directed by Mike Piscitelli.

Track listing
"I Gave You" (2:39)
"My Circle" (3:00)
"Four Screams" (3:24)
"Birch Ballad" (3:41)

References

2005 EPs
Will Oldham albums
Drag City (record label) EPs